Blue Sunshine is a 1978 American horror film written and directed by Jeff Lieberman, and starring Zalman King, Deborah Winters and Mark Goddard. The plot focuses on a series of random murders in Los Angeles, in which the only common link between the perpetrators is a mysterious batch of LSD that they had all taken years prior.

Over the years, the film attracted a cult following, and was released on special edition DVD by Synapse Entertainment in 2003. It has been shown at many film festivals since.

Plot
During a party, Frannie Scott (Richard Crystal) croons a Sinatra song and playfully tries to kiss his friend's date, causing the friend to pull Frannie's hair, which unexpectedly comes off. The bald Frannie then has a psychotic break, brutally murders several party guests, and chases Jerry Zipkin (Zalman King) into the nearby road, where Frannie is hit and killed by a passing truck.

Jerry is wrongly accused of the murders and goes on the lam, trying to gather evidence to prove his innocence, helped by his friends Alicia Sweeney (Deborah Winters) and surgeon David Blume (Robert Walden). After learning about a similar sudden mass murder by a bald police officer, Jerry discovers that ten years prior, a group of college students had taken a new form of LSD called "Blue Sunshine," provided by dealer Ed Flemming (Mark Goddard), and are now suddenly losing their hair and becoming homicidal maniacs many years after their trips are over. Flemming, now a respected local politician running for Congress, lies and tells Jerry he never heard of Blue Sunshine. When Jerry visits Flemming's estranged wife, Wendy, he finds she is also bald and about to murder two children she is babysitting. Jerry saves the children by pushing the knife-wielding Wendy off her apartment balcony, but ends up wrongly accused of her murder as well.

Jerry schemes to prove that Blue Sunshine is causing homicidal psychosis by finding a past user of the drug who is still living and can be tested for chromosome damage caused by the drug. Armed with a paraldehyde dart gun, Jerry goes to a Flemming rally at a shopping mall, having learned that Flemming's campaign manager/ bodyguard Wayne Mulligan (Ray Young) was a heavy Blue Sunshine user. Before Jerry's arrival, the now-bald Wayne goes on a rampage through the mall discotheque, beating and terrorizing its patrons including a police detective and Alicia, and causing crowds to flee the mall in panic (an escaped patron delivers the film's most famous line to Jerry by screaming "There's a bald maniac in there, and he's going batshit!"). Jerry tracks Wayne to an empty department store and paralyzes him with the dart gun. An on-screen epilogue states that Wayne was tested, found to have "extensive chromosomic aberrations", and confined to a sanitarium, and that 255 doses of Blue Sunshine are still unaccounted for.

Cast
 Zalman King as Jerry Zipkin
 Deborah Winters as Alicia Sweeney
 Mark Goddard as Edward Flemming
 Robert Walden as David Blume
 Charles Siebert as Detective Clay
 Ann Cooper as Wendy Flemming
 Ray Young as Wayne Mulligan
 Alice Ghostley as O'Malley's Neighbor
 Stefan Gierasch as Lieutenant Jennings
 Richard Crystal as Frannie Scott
 Bill Adler as Ralphie
 Barbara Quinn as Stephanie
 Adriana Shaw as Barbara O'Malley
 Bill Sorrells as Ritchie Grazzo
 Jeffrey Druce as Junkie
 Brion James as Tony

Production

Reception 

AllMovie gave the film a mildly favorable review, calling it "too uneven to please a general audience" but "offers enough moments of interest for fans of horror films and offbeat cult items."

Fawn Krisenthia of Cult Reviews wrote:The movie gets a thumbs-up since quirky (Jeff) Lieberman directs. You know you are entering Lieberman’s world when the very movie title is spoken by his parrot. I imagine that Lieberman had a checklist for his 70s style movie, things that were popular at the time. For example, random car chase? Check. Discothèque? Check. Conspiracy theory? Check. Obligatory ‘This movie is based on true events’ disclaimer at the end of the film? Check.Budd Wilkins of Slant Magazine gave the film two and a half stars out of five and called it "an unjustly neglected genre classic that delivers a deft fusion of horror-movie tropes, social satire, and cult-film weirdness."

In the Village Voice, Simon Abrams wrote:Shot at the end of 1976 and into early 1977, the influential film gradually amassed an eclectic but hardcore following over the years. Its champions include Gremlins filmmaker Joe Dante and even the late critic Andrew Sarris, who praised “Lieberman’s directional talent” and the film’s “intriguing premise” when Blue Sunshine screened on TV in 1982.

Film critic Matt Johns has written that while he overall liked the film, the ending lacked resolution. Using his popcorn bag system, he awarded the film five out of five bags.

References

External links
 
 
 Blue Sunshine at the TCM Database

1978 films
1978 horror films
1978 independent films
1970s psychological thriller films
American psychological horror films
Films about hallucinogens
American independent films
Films directed by Jeff Lieberman
Films shot in Los Angeles
Films set in Los Angeles
1970s English-language films
1970s American films